Rustler Park Fire Guard Station in the Chiracahua Mountains, near the area of Douglas, Arizona was built in 1934–35 by the Civilian Conservation Corps. It was listed on the National Register of Historic Places in 1993 for its architecture, which is vernacular and other log construction. It was designed by USDA Forest Service architects and served as institutional housing.

References

Park buildings and structures on the National Register of Historic Places in Arizona
Residential buildings on the National Register of Historic Places in Arizona
United States Forest Service ranger stations
Civilian Conservation Corps in Arizona
Government buildings completed in 1935
Buildings and structures in Cochise County, Arizona
Rustic architecture in Arizona
1935 establishments in Arizona
National Register of Historic Places in Cochise County, Arizona
Douglas, Arizona